Marie Caroline Gibert de Lametz, (18 July 1793 – 25 November 1879), was a French stage actress and a Princess Consort and regent de facto of Monaco by marriage to Florestan I, Prince of Monaco.

Life
She was the daughter of Charles-Thomas Gibert (b. 1765), who was a lawyer, and Marie-Françoise Le Gras de Vaubercey (1766–1842). The marriage of her parents ended in divorce, and she became the adopted stepdaughter of Antoine Rouyer de Lametz (1762–1836), Chevalier d'Empire and Knight of the Legion of Honour.

Marie Caroline was originally a stage actress, as was her future spouse, Florestan.  Maria Caroline Gibert de Lametz and Prince Florestan of Monaco, at that time both actors, married in Commercy on 27 November 1816 and had two children: Prince Charles III, and Princess Florestine. 

She was described as a skillful businesswoman: she handled the economy of the family, and successfully managed the fortune her spouse inherited from his mother (who had excluded her eldest son from her will because of his illegitimate issue) in 1826.

Princess of Monaco

Florestan ascended to the throne in Monaco in 1841, but he was never prepared to assume the role of prince — he had been an actor in the Théâtre de l'Ambigu-Comique — and the real power during his reign lay in the hands of his wife, who reportedly possessed great intelligence and "excelled at social skills." 

According to the historian Gustave Saige, Princess Caroline's intelligence was required to figure out the affairs of state, which Honoré V had handled absolutely by himself, not trusting anyone to advise or assist him.   By introducing a tax reform, she was able  to alleviate the difficult economic situation stemming from the Congress of Vienna assigning Monaco as a protectorate of the Kingdom of Sardinia rather than France.   Her involvement in state politics, however, gave bad publicity to Florestan.  When their son once reproached her for her de facto regent position, she replied that she ruled simply because she wanted to take responsibility for the welfare of the family. 

The couple attempted to meet local demands for greater democracy and offered two constitutions to the local population, but these were rejected, particularly by the people of Menton, who were given a better offer by King Charles Albert of Sardinia.    The Prince and Princess of Monaco then handed over power to their son Charles (later Prince Charles III).  
Encouraged by the Revolutions of 1848, however, the towns of Menton and Roquebrune revolted and declared themselves independent.    The crisis worsened when the King of Sardinia garrisoned Menton,   Florestan was dethroned, arrested, and imprisoned.   Florestan was restored to the throne in 1849, but Menton and Roquebrune were lost forever.  They had hoped to be annexed by Sardinia, but this did not occur, and the towns remained in a state of political limbo until they were finally ceded to France in 1861.

Later life

After her husband's death in 1856, her son, Prince Charles III took over control of the throne, after having been well prepared to assume power by his mother.  Together, they worked towards laying the foundation for Monaco as a major resort destination. 

She died on November 25, 1879.

Ancestry

Arms and emblems

References

 The Peerage retrieved 26 February 2007

|-

1793 births
1879 deaths
People from Coulommiers
Hereditary Princesses of Monaco
French stage actresses
Regents of Monaco
19th-century French actresses
House of Grimaldi
Princesses of Monaco
Burials at the Cathedral of Our Lady Immaculate